The Prue IIA is an American, high-wing, two-seat, T-tailed glider that was designed by Irving Prue and constructed by Ed Minghelle of Palmdale, California.

Design and development
Based on the Prue Two, the IIA incorporates many changes to the basic design, including a T-tail in place of a low-tail, fixed instead of retractable landing gear, a shorter two-piece wing instead of a three-piece wing and an empty weight that is  lighter. The Prue IIA was built by Minghelle between 1961 and 1964, culminating in a first flight in October 1964.

The Prue IIA has a  wing that employs a NACA 63-618 airfoil. The aircraft is of all-metal construction and seats two in tandem under a long single-piece canopy.

Only one Prue IIA was ever built.

Operational history
The Prue IIA was used to set several multi-place glider records. A second world out-and-return record was set in 1972, flying  from Pearblossom, California.

The IIA was removed from the Federal Aviation Administration aircraft registry on 16 March 1989 and now belongs to the National Soaring Museum.

Aircraft on display
National Soaring Museum - sole example, listed as "in storage".

Specifications (Prue IIA)

See also

References

1960s United States sailplanes
Homebuilt aircraft
Aircraft first flown in 1964
High-wing aircraft
T-tail aircraft